Alpura may refer to:

Alpura (company), a Mexican dairy company
Alpura, Madhubani, a village located in India